Salamabad may refer to:
Aşağı Salamabad, Azerbaijan
Yuxarı Salamabad, Azerbaijan
Salamabad, India, a crossing point on the Line of Control between India and Pakistan
Salamabad, Fars, Iran
Salamabad, West Azerbaijan, Iran